Inle may refer to:

 Inlé, an album
 Inle Lake, a lake in Burma
 Inle, Aunglan, a village in Aunglan Township, Burma
 Inle, Thayet, a village in Thayet Township, Burma
 Inle (Santería), a character in Santería mythology